Megachile rambutwan is a species of bee in the family Megachilidae. It was described by Cheesman in 1936.

References

Rambutwan
Insects described in 1936